Don Bosco Community College is a technical skill training institute in West Marianathapuram, near Dindigul, Tamil Nadu, India, founded in 2003. It provides diploma programmes in Tailoring, Computer, Kindergarten Teacher, House Electrician, Welding and Two wheeler mechanism to the target group of poor, marginalized, dropout youth and rural women. The institute is run by the Salesian Priests of Tiruchy Salesian Province.  The community college is affiliated to Tamil Nadu Open University (TNOU).

The community college was upgraded to College of Arts and Science and was shifted to Keela Eral, Thoothukudi District, in the year 2012. Now it is known as Don Bosco College of Arts and Science, Keela Eral. It has six undergraduate degree programmes and a post graduate degree programme now.

Contact Address 
Don Bosco Community College,
Malapatty Road,
Thottanuthu Post,
Dindigul - 624 005,
Tamil Nadu,

References

External links
www.donboscodgl.org

Salesian schools
Vocational education in India
Catholic universities and colleges in India
Colleges in Tamil Nadu
Education in Dindigul district
Educational institutions established in 2003
2003 establishments in Tamil Nadu